Herbert Mohr-Mayer (born September 22, 1933) is a German jeweller who was president of Victor Mayer Co. from 1965 to 2005. He continued the legacy of the Russian jeweller Peter Carl Fabergé.

He was born to the jeweller Edmund Mohr and his wife Maria Mayer in Pforzheim, Germany. His grandfather was the German jeweller Victor Mayer who founded the Victor Mayer jewelry company in Pforzheim in 1890. Another famed family member is his brother the computer pioneer Manfred Mohr.

Mohr-Mayers childhood was overshadowed by the bombing of Pforzheim in 1945 during World War II. The dramatic event took the lives of many of his childhood friends and destroyed 83% of the inner city. The building he grew up in which also housed the Victor Mayer Co. remained miraculously untouched by the disaster.

In 1960 he received a PhD in business administration at the University of Munich, then he worked with jewellers Asprey in London and Altenloh, Brussels until 1964. There he refined his taste and skills in jewelry making.

In 1965 he and Hubert Mayer became owners of the Victor Mayer Jewelry manufacturing company in Pforzheim.

Mohr-Mayer turned the Victor Mayer company over to his son Marcus O. Mohr in 2001 and retired from his position in 2003. Mohr-Mayer continues to represent the Fabergé workmaster at events of the Collegium Fabergé and gives lectures on the history and making of Fabergé eggs.

Mohr-Mayer is also a nephew of the German women's lib activist Else Mayer. He became instrumental in turning her nunnery in Bonn into a charitable foundation. Herbert Mohr-Mayer has been volunteering in the Else Mayer Foundation since 2004.

Restoring the Fabergé line

Herbert Mohr-Mayer revived the Fabergé line, which had been discontinued by the heirs of Peter Carl Fabergé. The grandsons of Fabergé sold the licensing rights to Fabergé Co. in 1989. In the same year, Fabergé Inc. appointed Victor Mayer as the new licensee.
After years of research in the fields of traditional jewelry making Mohr-Mayer reestablished long-lost manufacturing techniques such as guilloché and vitreous enamel. In 1991 the company presented the first Fabergé-line object since the closing of  the Fabergé workshop in 1917.

Fabergé objects from the house of Victor Mayer have been acquired by the Kremlin Museum, the Art Museum of New Orleans, and many private collections around the world.

See also
Gorbachev Peace Egg

References
http://mohr-mayer.com/
Status news 
Mieks.com 

Businesspeople from Baden-Württemberg
1933 births
Living people
People from Pforzheim